Folker may refer to:

Folker (album)
Folker (magazine)